Bruce Middleton Hope Shand  (22 January 1917 – 11 June 2006) was an officer in the British Army. He is best known as the father of Queen Camilla.

Early life
Shand was born in London into an upper-class gentry family whose ancestors had moved to England from Scotland. He was the son of Philip Morton Shand (1888–1960), an architectural writer and critic who was a close friend of Walter Gropius and Le Corbusier and whose company, Finmar, imported furniture by Alvar Aalto into Great Britain. His mother was Edith Marguerite Harrington (1893–1981), later Mrs. Herbert Charles Tippet. Bruce Shand's parents divorced when he was three years old. His father went on to remarry three times. Shand did not see his father again until he was 18.  One of his two half-sisters was Baroness Howe of Idlicote, wife of former Chancellor of the Exchequer and Deputy Prime Minister Lord Howe.

Shand's mother remarried Herbert Charles Tippet, a golf course designer. Contrary to some newspaper reports, young Shand was not abandoned by his mother and stepfather but was taken to live with them in Westbury, Long Island, New York, in 1921. He left out this fact from his autobiography, giving the erroneous impression of having been abandoned.

After visiting England in June 1923, Bruce and his mother returned to the US in September 1923 with the stated intent (according to US immigration records) of residing permanently in the United States and taking US citizenship.  When he next returned to Britain it was to begin his education, organised and paid for by his grandparents. His mother and stepfather returned to Britain in 1927, then moved to Ireland in the 1930s.  His stepfather died at Rye in 1947 and his mother died in Cooden Beach, Sussex, in 1981.

Shand was sent to France to learn French. He was educated at Rugby and Sandhurst and was commissioned into the 12th Lancers as a second lieutenant on 28 January 1937. He became a troop leader in "A" Squadron.  His interests included fox hunting, polo and reading.

Second World War
Shand was promoted to lieutenant on 28 January 1940. He served in France as part of the British Expeditionary Force. The 12th Lancers were equipped with lightly armed Morris armoured cars in a reconnaissance role. The regiment spent six months at Foncquevillers during the Phoney War, then advanced to the River Dyle and retreated in the face of the German blitzkrieg.  He aided in covering the withdrawal to Dunkirk, from where he was evacuated back to England, arriving back in Margate on 31 May 1940. For his actions, he was awarded an MC on 5 July 1940.

After a period with the regiment in Poole and in Reigate, and an interlude training the North Irish Horse in Northern Ireland, Shand was sent with the regiment to North Africa in September 1941 as part of the 7th Armoured Division, where he was promoted to the temporary rank of captain.  He earned his second MC in January 1942, covering the withdrawal of armoured cars of the 6th Rajputana Rifles in the face of a strong counterattack by the Afrika Corps. The award was gazetted on 9 July of that year.

He met Winston Churchill shortly before the Second Battle of El Alamein. On 6 November 1942, on a probe towards Marsa Matruh, his vehicle was surrounded and destroyed. Shand's two crewmen were killed, and he was wounded. He was captured and taken to Germany as a prisoner of war. After treatment in Athens, he was held at Oflag IX A in Spangenberg Castle, near Spangenberg, for the duration of the war. While a prisoner of war, he was promoted to the rank of war-substantive captain and to the substantive rank of captain on 28 January 1945.

Later life and death
After his liberation, Shand returned to England in 1945. Due to his wounds, which made him unfit for active service, he was retired from the army on 25 April 1947, leaving with the honorary rank of major. On 2 January 1946, he married the Hon Rosalind Maud Cubitt, daughter of the 3rd Baron Ashcombe and Sonia Rosemary Keppel, at St Paul's Church, Knightsbridge. They had two daughters, Camilla (b. 1947), Annabel (b. 1949) and a son, Mark (1951–2014). He kept a house, The Laines in Plumpton in Sussex and a second in South Kensington, but later moved to Dorset.

He had various business interests, most notably was a partner in Block, Grey and Block, a firm of wine merchants in South Audley Street, Mayfair, later joining Ellis, Son and Vidler of Hastings and London. Shand was a reviewer of military books for Country Life magazine. In 1990, he wrote a war memoir entitled Previous Engagements and was the editor of a fellow army officer Tim Bishop's memoirs titled  One Young Soldier: The Memoirs of a Cavalryman, which was published in 1993. Shand compiled Bishop's diaries to a book after his death in 1986.

Shand was a Deputy Lieutenant of Sussex, and Vice-Lieutenant of East Sussex from 1974 until 1992.  He remained passionate about fox hunting, and was Master of Southdown Fox Hounds from 1956 to 1975.  He was Exon and later Adjutant and Clerk of the Cheque of the Queen's Body Guard of the Yeomen of the Guard. Shand supported the Conservative Party in the UK.

In 1993, Shand reportedly reproached the Prince of Wales at a private event for ruining his daughter's life after the relationship became public. After a period of a strained relationship, both men eventually grew to like each other.

His wife Rosalind died on 14 July 1994, aged 72, having long suffered from osteoporosis. He died from cancer in 2006, aged 89 at his home in Stourpaine, Dorset, with his family at his bedside. After a funeral service at the Holy Trinity Church in Stourpaine on 16 June, Shand's body was cremated.

Memoirs
Author. (1990). Previous Engagements. Michael Russell Publishing Ltd 
Editor. (1993). One Young Soldier: The Memoirs of a Cavalryman. Michael Russell Publishing Ltd

Arms

References

1917 births
2006 deaths
Deaths from cancer in England
British people of Scottish descent
Bruce
12th Royal Lancers officers
British Army personnel of World War II
British World War II prisoners of war
Graduates of the Royal Military College, Sandhurst
Recipients of the Military Cross
World War II prisoners of war held by Germany
Deputy Lieutenants of Sussex
Officers of the Yeomen of the Guard
People educated at Rugby School
Masters of foxhounds in England
People from North Dorset District
Writers from London
British memoirists
20th-century British businesspeople
20th-century memoirists
People from Plumpton, East Sussex